Albert Alarr (born March 30, 1956) is an American television soap opera director and producer. He undertaked actor William Christian for the role of "TR Coates" in Days of Our Lives.

Producing credits

"The Break Up Guy"
Executive Producer (2009)

"Loungitude"
Co-Executive Producer, Corday Productions (2007)

"Days of Our Lives"
Asst. Producer (2005–2009)
Producer (2011–July 31, 2015)
Co-Executive Producer (August 3, 2015–present)

Directing credits

All My Children
 Occasional Director (2003)

Days of Our Lives
 Director (2003–present)

Port Charles
 Director (entire run, 1997–2003)

The Young and the Restless
 Occasional Director (March 3, 2011 – present)

Beacon Hill (web series)
 Director (2014)

Awards and nominations
Daytime Emmy Award
Nominated, 2006, Directing Team, Days of our Lives

Directors Guild of America Award
Nominated, 2005, Directing, Days of our Lives
Nominated, 1999, Directing, Days of our Lives

Executive producing history

References

External links

American television directors
1956 births
Living people
American soap opera directors